Krishna district of the Indian state of Andhra Pradesh.

References 

Mandals in Krishna district